This is a list of U.S. Army rocket launchers by model number. Launchers can be either tube-type or rail-type.

M number

Launchers
 M1 rocket launcher, 2.36 inch, solid tube shoulder mount. Bazooka
 A1 Simplified design with improved electrical system
 M1 rocket projector, 3.25 inch, rail, trailer mount
 M2
 M3
 M4
 M5
 M6
 M7
 M8 rocket launcher, possibly T34 rocket launcher?
 M9 rocket launcher, 2.36 inch, break down tube, shoulder mount. Bazooka
 A1 Battery ignition replaced by trigger magneto
 M10 rocket launcher, 4.5 inch, 3 plastic tube, aircraft mount.
 M11
 M12 rocket launcher, 4.5 inch, single tube, tripod mount. 
 A1 plastic tube (M12/M12A1 use M8 HE rockets and M9 practice rockets)
 E2 Magnesium alloy tube (uses T38E7 HE rockets and T39E7 practice rockets)
 M13
 M14 rocket launcher, 4.5 inch, 3 steel tube, aircraft mount.
 M15 rocket launcher, 4.5 inch, 3 magnesium tube, aircraft mount.
 M16 Rocket Projector on M4 Tank: 4.6 inch 60 tube rocket launcher (T-72)
 M17 rocket launcher, 7.2 inch, 20-tube, tank mount.
 M18 rocket launcher, 2.36 inch, aluminium break down tube, shoulder mount, Bazooka
 M19
 M20 rocket launcher, 3.5 inch, break down tube, shoulder mount, Super Bazooka
 M21 rocket launcher, 4.5 inch, 25-tube, trailer mount. (T123)
 M22 rocket launcher, fixed, Nike (rocket) (Ajax)
 M23 rocket launcher, 4.5 inch, 24-tube, (T66)and(T66E2)?
 M24 rocket launcher, 7.2 inch, 24-rail, for M25 (CG Gas) or M27 (CK Gas) chemical rocket
 M25 rocket launcher, 3.5 inch, repeating, tripod-mounted, Bazooka
 M26 rocket launcher, fixed, (M22 with racks) Nike (Ajax)
 M27 rocket launcher, rail type, for MGM-5 Corporal
 M28
 M29
 M30
 M31
 M32 rocket launcher, 4.5 inch, trailer mount
 M33 rocket launcher, trailer mount, for MGR-1 Honest John
 M34 rocket launcher, for MGR-3 Little John
 M35
 M36 rocket launcher, fixed, for Nike (rocket) (Hercules)
 M37
 M38
 M39
 M40
 M47 Dragon (1966)
 M48 rocket launcher, towed, MIM-72 Chaparral (1969)
 M65 aircraft mounted, BGM-71 TOW (1965)
 XM70E2 rocket launcher (1959-1963)
 M72 rocket launcher, 66mm, telescoping tube, shoulder mount, M72 LAW (1963)
 M74 rocket platform, towed, PGM-11 Redstone
 M78 rocket launcher, for MIM-23 Hawk (1959)
 (M81 gun/missile launcher 152mm for M551 Sheridan (1966)
 M91 rocket launcher, 115mm, 45-tube, trailer mount for M55 rocket
 M94 rocket launcher, mobile, Nike (rocket) (hercules)
 XM132 viper
 M136 AT4
 M141 Bunker Defeat Munition
 M141 rocket launcher, 2.75 inch, 7-tube aircraft mount, Mk 4/Mk 40 Folding-Fin Aerial Rocket
 M142 High Mobility Artillery Rocket System (HIMARS)
 M143 rocket launcher, 3.5-inch, 1-tube, tripod mount (M24 antitank mine)M24 mine
 M147 rocket launcher, 2.75 inch, FIM-43 Redeye (1961)
 M151 rocket launcher, BGM-71 TOW (1970)
 M157 rocket launcher, 2.75 inch, 7-tube, aircraft mount, Mk 4/Mk 40 Folding-Fin Aerial Rocket
 M158 rocket launcher, 2.75 inch, 7-tube aircraft mount, Mk 4/Mk 40 Folding-Fin Aerial Rocket
 M159 rocket launcher, 2.75 inch, 19-tube, aircraft mount, Mk 4/Mk 40 Folding-Fin Aerial Rocket
 M171 rocket launcher, 2.75 inch, FIM-43 Redeye (1966)
 M190 rocket launcher, 35mm, telescoping tube, practice M72 LAW
 XM-191 rocket launcher (standardized as M202)
 M192 rocket launcher, towed, triple launcher, MIM-23 Hawk
 M200 rocket launcher, 2.75 inch, 19-tube, aircraft mount, Mk 4/Mk 40 Folding-Fin Aerial Rocket
 M202 rocket launcher, 66mm 4-tube, (1969) M202A1 FLASH
 M220 TOW 2nd series
 M260 rocket launcher, 2.75 inch, 7-tube, Hydra 70
 M261 rocket launcher, 2.75 inch, 19-tube, Hydra 70
 M269 launcher/loader, M270 Multiple Launch Rocket System (MLRS)
 M272 rocket launcher, 7 inch, 4-rail, AGM-114 Hellfire
 M279 rocket launcher, 7 inch, 2-rail, AGM-114 Hellfire
 M299 rocket launcher, 7 inch, 4-rail, AGM-114 Hellfire
 M310 rocket launcher, 7 inch, 2-rail, AGM-114 Hellfire
 M474 transporter erector launcher, Pershing 1
 M727 carrier/launcher, MIM-23 Hawk
 M730 carrier/launcher, MIM-72 Chaparral
 M752 carrier/launcher, MGM-52 Lance
 M790 erector launcher, Pershing 1a
 M901 launcher, trailer mount, MIM-104 Patriot
 M1003 erector launcher, Pershing II
 XM546 missile carrier/launcher, MIM-46 Mauler surface-to-air missile

Test number
T numbers were given to development models.

 T1 rocket launcher, 2.36 inch, solid tube shoulder mount. M1 Bazooka
 T3 rocket launcher, 4.5 inch, 1-tube on M4 carriage, (37 mm Gun M3)
 T27 rocket launcher, 4.5 inch, 8-tube, vehicle or ground mount, Xylophone
 T28
 T29
 T30 rocket launcher, 4.5 inch, 3-tube, aircraft mount
 T31
 T32 rocket launcher, 4.5 inch, 32-tube, tank mount
 T33
 T34 rocket launcher, 4.5 inch, 60-tube, tank mount, T34 Calliope
 T35 rocket launcher, 4.5 inch, single tube, tripod mount, (M12)?
 T36 rocket launcher, 4.5 inch, 8-tube, jeep mount
 T37 rocket launcher, 7.2 inch, 20 tube, vehicle mount
 T38
 T39 rocket launcher, 7.2 inch, 20-tube,
 T40 rocket launcher, 7.2 inch, 20-tube, tank mount, (M17) (whiz-bang)
 T44 rocket launcher, 4.5 inch, 120 tube, DUKW mounted
 T45 automatic rocket launcher, 4.5 inch, frame and rail, vehicle mounted
 T59 rocket launcher, 10.75 inch, 18-rail, tracked trailer mount (mine clearing)
 T64 rocket launcher, 5 inch, 0-length rail, HVAR
 T66 rocket launcher, 4.5 inch, 24-tube, trailer mount, Honeycomb
 T72 Rocket Projector on M4 Tank: 4.6 inch 60 tube rocket launcher (standardized as M16?)
 T73 Rocket Projector on M4 Tank: 4.6 inch 10 tube rocket launcher
 T76 Rocket Projector on M4 Tank: 7.5 inch rocket launcher
 T99 Rocket Projector on M26 Tank: Two 11 tube launchers on sides of the turret
 T103 Rocket launcher, 8 inch, 1-rail, trailer mount
 T105 Rocket Projector on M4A1 Medium Tank: Long 7.2 inch launcher
 T123 rocket launcher, 4.5 inch, 25-tube, trailer mount,(M21) (1951)
 T128 rocket launcher, 46-tube, semi-mobile, Loki (rocket)
 T129 rocket launcher, 6.5 inch, Multiple Rocket Launcher (1952)
 T148 rocket launcher, rail, MGM-21 dart

See also
 Rocket artillery
 List of rocket artillery
 Mattress (rocket)
 List of U.S. military vehicles by model number

References
 TM 9-2300 Standard Artillery and Fire Control Materiel. Dated 7 February 1944.
 TM 9-2300 Artillery Materiel and Associated Equipment. Dated May 1949.
 TM 9-392 4.5-Inch Multiple Rocket Launchers T66 and T66E2. Dated July 1945.
http://www.ibiblio.org/hyperwar/USA/ref/TM/PDFs/TM9-392.pdf
 TM 9-394 4.5-Inch Rocket Materiel for Ground Use. Dated 7 February 1945.
 http://www.ibiblio.org/hyperwar/USA/ref/TM/PDFs/TM9-394.pdf
 TM 9-395 4.5-Inch Aircraft Rocket Materiel. Dated 12 September 1944.
http://www.ibiblio.org/hyperwar/USA/ref/TM/pdfs/TM9-395.pdf
 ST 9-159 Handbook of Ordnance Material. Dated March 1968.
("ST" stands for "Special Text")
("TM" stands for "Technical Manual")

External links
  film on jeep launcher
 90th Infantry Division Preservation Group page on Bazookas and Equipment
 Robert Goddard--America's Rocket Pioneer
 http://cgsc.cdmhost.com/cdm4/document.php?CISOROOT=/p4013coll9&CISOPTR=312&REC=8
 http://www.designation-systems.net/dusrm/index.html
 http://www.globalsecurity.org/military/library/report/1987/MAF.htm
 https://web.archive.org/web/20100905111603/http://tri.army.mil/LC/CS/csa/aaarmsys.htm
 http://sill-www.army.mil/famag/1945/SEP_1945/SEP_1945_PAGES_515_522.pdf
 http://www.toadmanstankpictures.com/m21.htm  (M-21 launcher)
 http://www.historylink101.com/wwII_b-w/marines/IwoRockets/index.html good pics
 https://web.archive.org/web/20070427125135/http://www.752ndtank.com/RocketTanks.html
 https://www.youtube.com/watch?v=Cef6xrrhOm4 training film on T-66

Rocket launchers
Rocket artillery
Rocket weapons
Rocket launchers by model number